Callichroma auricomum is a species of Callichroma in the family Cerambycidae.

Synonyms
 Callichroma auricomum cyanescens Schmidt, 1924
 Callichroma auricomum rubescens Schmidt, 1924
 Callichroma auricomum viridescens Schmidt, 1924 nec Thomson, 1858
 Callichroma suturale (Fabricius, 1781)
 Cerambyx auricomus Linnaeus, 1767
 Cerambyx suturalis Fabricius, 1781
 Callichroma auricoma (Linnaeus, 1767)

Description

This longhorn is characterized by well-developed hind legs. Elytra show a black and metallic green or bronze coloration.

Distribution
This species can be found in Colombia, Ecuador, Peru, Brazil, Guiana, Suriname, French Guiana and Bolivia.

Bibliography
 Napp D.S. & Martins U.R. 2005: Homonymies in Callichromatini (Coleoptera, Cerambycidae). Revista Brasileira de Entomologia, 49(3).
 Demets Yolande 1976: Notes sur les Callichromatini (Coleoptera, Cerambycidae), IV. Étude préliminaire des genres Schwarzerion Schmidt, 1924 et Xenochroma Schmidt, 1924. Papéis Avulsos de Zoologia, São Paulo, 29 (17): 121-140, 29 figs.

References

Callichromatini
Beetles described in 1767
Taxa named by Carl Linnaeus